Srednogorie Heights are the heights rising to 1220 m (Mount Ignatiev) on the northwest side of Trinity Peninsula, Antarctic Peninsula.  Situated east of Bone Bay, west of Louis-Philippe Plateau, north of Russell West Glacier and south of Malorad Glacier.  Extending 7.5 km in east-west direction and 7 km in north-south direction.

The heights are named after Sredna Gora Mountains in central Bulgaria.

Location
German-British mapping in 1996.

Maps
 Trinity Peninsula. Scale 1:250000 topographic map No. 5697. Institut für Angewandte Geodäsie and British Antarctic Survey, 1996.
 Antarctic Digital Database (ADD). Scale 1:250000 topographic map of Antarctica. Scientific Committee on Antarctic Research (SCAR), 1993–2016.

References
 Bulgarian Antarctic Gazetteer. Antarctic Place-names Commission. (details in Bulgarian, basic data in English)
 Srednogorie Heights. SCAR Composite Antarctic Gazetteer

External links
Srednogorie Heights. Copernix satellite image

Mountains of Trinity Peninsula
Bulgaria and the Antarctic